NOTE: This page is missing info on the DuMont Network, which started daytime transmission before any other United States television network.

Monday-Friday

By network

ABC
New Series
The Singing Lady

CBS

New Series
The Missus Goes a-Shopping

Not Returning From 1946-47

NBC

Returning Series
The Swift Home Service Club

New Series
Howdy Doody
Playtime

Not Returning From 1946-47

Dumont

New Series
Okay, Mother
TV Shopper

See also
1947-48 United States network television schedule (prime-time)

Sources
https://web.archive.org/web/20071015122215/http://curtalliaume.com/abc_day.html
https://web.archive.org/web/20071015122235/http://curtalliaume.com/cbs_day.html
https://web.archive.org/web/20071012211242/http://curtalliaume.com/nbc_day.html

United States weekday network television schedules
1947 in American television
1948 in American television